The 1877–78 season was Morton Football Club's first season in which they competed at a national level, entering the fifth Scottish Cup.

Fixtures and results

Scottish Cup

Friendlies

References

External links
Greenock Morton FC official site

Greenock Morton F.C. seasons
Morton